State Street Bridge may refer to:

 Bataan-Corregidor Memorial Bridge, carrying State Street across the Chicago River in Chicago, Illinois
 State Street Bridge (Mason City, Iowa), listed on the National Register of Historic Places (NRHP) in Cerro Gordo County, Iowa
 State Street Bridge (Bridgeport, Michigan), NRHP-listed in Saginaw County, Michigan
 State Street Bridge (Harrisburg, Pennsylvania)